Ovtchinnikovia is a genus of Asian tangled nest spiders containing the single species, Ovtchinnikovia caucasica. It was  first described by Yuri M. Marusik, M. M. Kovblyuk & A. V. Ponomarev in 2010, and has only been found in Russia.

References

Amaurobiidae
Monotypic Araneomorphae genera
Spiders of Russia